Imiprothrin is a synthetic pyrethroid insecticide. It is an ingredient in some commercial and consumer insecticide products for indoor use. It has low acute toxicity to humans through the inhalation and dermal routes, but to insects it acts as a neurotoxin causing paralysis. It is effective against cockroaches, waterbugs, ants, silverfish, crickets and spiders, among others.

References

Chrysanthemate esters
Hydantoins
Cyclopropanes
Propargyl compounds